The Middle Branch Mousam River is a  river in southern Maine, flowing through the town of Alfred in York County. It is a tributary of the Mousam River, which flows to the Atlantic Ocean.

See also
List of rivers of Maine

References

Maine Streamflow Data from the USGS
Maine Watershed Data From Environmental Protection Agency

Alfred, Maine
Rivers of York County, Maine
Rivers of Maine